Coatlicue is the name given to a hypothetical star which gave rise to the Sun and then exploded as a supernova. Coatlicue would have been at least thirty times the mass of the Sun, and while on the main sequence its strong winds would have compressed the gas of the local nebula and given birth to hundreds of stars, including the Sun. The existence and the characteristics of this star were deduced from the presence of aluminium-26 in meteorites, which was expelled in the winds of the massive star.

Name 
Cōātlīcue is the mother of the Sun in the Aztecs' cosmogony.

This name is unofficial; it was proposed by Matthieu Gounelle and Georges Meynet, the authors of an article in Astronomy & Astrophysics.

References

Further reading 
 
 
 
 

Hypothetical stars